The Aspid GT-21 Invictus is a sportscar from Spanish automotive manufacturer Aspid, creators of the 2008 IFR Aspid. Like their previous model, the GT-21 as an open-wheel car. 

It is powered by a BMW 4.4-litre V8 engine producing 450 horsepower.

The occupancy space allows for seats to be rearranged to accommodate two backseat passengers. Its boot-size of 275 litres allows the Aspid GT-21 Invictus to be used for short trips and getaways during the weekend. 

Aspid planned to produce 250 models a year but its unclear if any were actually produced.

References

External links
Official Website

2010s cars
Rear-wheel-drive vehicles
Coupés
Sports cars
Cars introduced in 2012
Upcoming car models
Cars of Spain